The 2013 Russian Cup was held in Penza, Russia from 17 August 2013 until 21 August 2013.

Medal winners

Team Result

All-Around Result

Vault Result

Uneven Bars Result

Balance Beam Result

Floor Exercise Result

External links
https://web.archive.org/web/20130906062221/http://sportgymrus.ru/contest/10077/default.aspx

2013
2013 in gymnastics
2013 in Russian sport